A given is a statement or a condition assumed to be true or known, often to explain or give an example of something; for related topics, see:

 Presumption (in law)
 Axiom (in formal logic)
 Givenness (in discourse)
 Conditional probability, usually expressed using the term "given"

Given may also refer to:

Places
 Given, Iran, or Givan, a village in West Azerbaijan, Iran
 Given, West Virginia, a settlement in the United States

People with the surname
 Josiah Given, American judge in the Iowa Supreme Court
 Leslie E. Given, American Justice for the Supreme Court of Appeals of West Virginia
 Shay Given (born 1976), Irish footballer
 Thelma Given (1896–1977), American violinist

Other uses
 "Given", a song by Seether from Karma and Effect
 Given (manga), a Japanese boys' love manga series
 Given Imaging, an Israeli medical technology company
 , the containership Given from the Ever group (aka Evergreen)

See also

 Given name
 Givens, a surname
 Givan (disambiguation)
 Give (disambiguation)
 Gift (disambiguation)